Linguistic island may refer to: 

 Language island (language enclave), an area
 Island (linguistics) (syntactic island), a construction